Šija is a former settlement in the Municipality of Moravče in central Slovenia. It is now part of the village of Limbarska Gora. The area is part of the traditional region of Upper Carniola. The municipality is now included in the Central Slovenia Statistical Region.

Geography
Šija lies in the eastern part of the village of Limbarska Gora, on the eastern slope of the hill ascending to the main settlement.

History
Šija had a population of 14 living in two houses in 1900. Šija was annexed by Limbarska Gora (at that time still called Sveti Valentin) in 1952, ending its existence as an independent settlement.

References

External links
Šija on Geopedia

Populated places in the Municipality of Moravče
Former settlements in Slovenia